John Cohen may refer to:

Politicians
John S. Cohen (1870–1935), U.S. Senator from Georgia
John Cohen (Australian politician) (1859–1939), Australian politician and judge

Others
John Cohen (baseball) (born 1966), American baseball coach
John Cohen (musician) (1932–2019), American folk musician and photographer/filmmaker
John Cohen (psychologist) (born 1911), British psychologist, see Thinker's Library
J. M. Cohen (John Michael Cohen, 1903–1989), British writer and translator

See also
Jack Cohen (disambiguation)
Jonathan Cohen (disambiguation)